Levinus Tollenaar (1918 – 1970), was a Dutch artist.

Biography
He was born in Haarlem. According to the RKD he was a member of De Groep and became known for monumental works in brick.

He died in Haarlem.

References

1918 births
1970 deaths
Dutch artists
Artists from Haarlem